Chilas Airfield  is an airfield located at Chilas, a town in Gilgit–Baltistan, Pakistan.

History
It was built during the British Raj in 1927. After independence, Frontier Works Organisation (FWO) further developed it to support the construction of Karakoram Highway.

The airfield was also used by Pakistan Air Force in 1960s and 1970s and flew C-130 planes from there.

See also
 List of airports in Pakistan

References

External links

Airports in Gilgit-Baltistan